Thomas Victor Bulpin (1918–1999) was a South African writer. He wrote 29 books and over 2,000 booklets, pamphlets, newspapers, magazine features, and travel videos. He wrote about African big-game hunters as well as South African travel and history. Most of his books are out of print. He was born in 1918 in Umkomaas, Kwazulu Natal. At the age of 16 he entered the cinema business as a technician, later enlisting with the South African Air force. He also joined the Associated British Cinema Corporation and was sent to cover Africa for their news reels. While traveling, he gathered information for his books. Later he began his own publishing company and focused on this and his travels until his death in 1999 at the age of 81, following a long battle with skin cancer. TV Bulpin is the author of Discovering Southern Africa and Tavern of the Seas.

Selected works

 Discovering Southern Africa, 1980
 East Africa and the Islands, 1956
 Illustrated Guide to Southern Africa, 1980
 Islands in a Forgotten Sea, 1959
 Lost Trails on the Low Veld, 1950
 Lost Trails of the Transvaal, 1956
 Natal and the Zulu Country, 1966
 Shaka's Country: A Book of Zululand, 1952
 The Golden Republic, 1954
 The Great Trek, 1968
 The Hunter is Death, 1962
 The Ivory Trail, 1954
 The White Whirlwind, 1961
 Tickey: The Story of Eric Hoyland, 1976
 To the Banks of the Zambezi, 1965
 To the Shores of Natal, 1953
 Trail of the Copper King, 1959
 Storm over the Transvaal, 1955
 Southern Africa: Land of Beauty and Splendor, 1977
 Scenic Wonders of Southern Africa, 1985
 Tavern of the Seas: The Story Of Cape Town, Robben Island And The Cape Peninsular, 2003 (published posthumously)

References

External links
 History of Barberton that cites Bulpin
 Lost Trails on the Lowveld
 Natal and the Zulu Country 
 Island in a Forgotten Sea
 To the Bank of the Zambezi
 The Ivory Trail

South African travel writers
1918 births
1999 deaths
Deaths from skin cancer
Deaths from cancer in South Africa